The Prairie du Chien Post Office was added to the National Register of Historic Places in 2000.

History
The post office was built as part of the Works Progress Administration of the New Deal. A sculpture of Jacques Marquette and Louis Jolliet was placed inside.

References

Prairie du Chien, Wisconsin
Post office buildings on the National Register of Historic Places in Wisconsin
Works Progress Administration in Wisconsin
Buildings and structures in Crawford County, Wisconsin
Modern Movement architecture
National Register of Historic Places in Crawford County, Wisconsin